Gravitcornutia altoperuviana is a species of moth of the family Tortricidae. It is found in Peru.

The wingspan is 14 mm. The ground colour of the forewings is cream and the strigulae (fine streaks) and two subterminal lines are ochreous cream. There are a few blackish dots along the dorsum and costa and two black spots at the termen beneath the apex. The hindwings are cream with a few subterminal brownish dots.

Etymology
The species name refers to the collection of the species at high elevations in Peru and is derived from Latin altus (meaning high).

References

Moths described in 2010
Gravitcornutia
Moths of South America
Taxa named by Józef Razowski